David Cobb Rosebrook (January 19, 1874 – March 31, 1937) was an American cornet soloist, trumpeter, composer and conductor. He was the principal trumpet with the San Francisco Symphony from 1912 to 1919, and the principal cornet soloist with the Goldman Band in 1935.

Performance career
David Rosebrook began his career as a cornet player in New York and Boston. He moved to San Francisco in 1899. When Henry Ohlmeyer took his band on a tour of West Coast cities during the early summer of 1910, Rosebrook was his cornet soloist and Herbert L. Clarke was the "special soloist". From 1911 to 1912 he was the Assistant Principal Trumpet with the San Francisco Symphony. He became Principal Trumpet in 1912 and remained in that position through 1919. From 1916 to 1925 he was the cornet soloist with the Golden Gate Band under the direction of Paul Steindrof and he also played many solo engagements with the Oakland Municipal Band during the 1920s.

David Rosebrook was the conductor of the Islam Shrine Band from 1919 to 1925. In 1930, Rosebrook returned to the San Francisco Symphony as second trumpet, and he remained there in that position  through 1935 until the orchestra was suspended. On occasion, he conducted the orchestra.

In 1935, David Rosebrook was hired by Edwin Franko Goldman to be his cornet soloist in the Goldman Band, replacing Del Staigers. During this summer season he performed several original compositions. After playing for about 5 weeks, he became ill and returned home to San Francisco. This was his last professional engagement.

References

1874 births
American cornetists
1937 deaths
Musicians from Portland, Maine
Musicians from San Francisco